Law, Law & Potter was an architecture firm in Madison, Wisconsin; Potter Lawson, Inc. is its modern-day successor.  Some of its buildings are listed on the U.S. National Register of Historic Places for their architecture.  The firm was Madison's largest and "arguably most important" architectural firm in the 1920s and 1930s.

The founding partners were brothers James R. Law III (1885–1952) and Edward J. Law (1891-1983), who were both born in Madison and graduates of the University of Pennsylvania's School of Architecture.  Ellis J. Potter (1890 – 1990) joined them in 1926.  Paul E. Nystrom (1899–?) joined as a draftsman and was an architect in the firm by 1931, and the firm eventually became Law, Law, Potter, & Nystrom.

James R. Law (1855–1952) was born in Madison.  He worked in the architectural office of Louis Claude and Edward Starck in 1901, and later studied at the School of Architecture of the University of Pennsylvania, and graduated in 1909.  Then back in Madison he worked for architect Arthur Peabody before founding his own firm in 1914.

Works include:
Ray S. and Theo P. Owen summer cottage, (1911) 5805 Winnequah Rd, Monona (Law & Law)

Gay Building (1913 or 1915), Madison's first skyscraper, a nine-story building (Law & Law) 
Beavers Insurance building, 119 Martin Luther King Jr. Blvd., Madison (Law & Law)
Bank of Madison building, 1 West Main St., Madison (Law & Law)
First National Bank building, 1 North Pinckney St., Madison (demolished) (Law & Law)

Longfellow School (1917 with additions in 1924 & 1938) 1010 Chandler St, Madison, NRHP-listed.
Madison Masonic Temple (1915 and 1922 designs; built 1923–25), 301 Wisconsin Ave., Madison, (Law & Law), NRHP-listed
Alpha Xi Delta sorority house (1923) 12 Langdon St, Madison (Law, Law & Potter), contributing to Langdon Street Historic District.
Acacia fraternity house (1924) 108 Langdon St, Madison (Law & Law), contributing to Langdon Street Historic District.
Beta Theta Pi fraternity house (1925) 622 Mendota Ct, Madison (Law & Law), contributing to Langdon Street Historic District.
a 1925 house in College Hills Historic District (Law, Law & Potter).
Kappa Alpha Theta sorority house (1926) 237 Lakelawn Place (Law, Law & Potter), contributing to Langdon Street Historic District.

Phi Gamma Delta fraternity house (1926) 16 Langdon St, Madison (Law, Law & Potter), contributing to Langdon Street Historic District.
Theta Chi fraternity house (1926) 144 Langdon St, Madison (Law, Law & Potter), contributing to Langdon Street Historic District.
Chi Phi fraternity house (1928) 610 N Henry St, Madison (Law, Law & Potter), contributing to Langdon Street Historic District.
Alpha Omicron Pi sorority (1928) 636 Langdon St, Madison (Law, Law & Potter) French Provincial style, contributing to Langdon Street Historic District.
Six homes in the Shorewood Historic District in Shorewood Hills, built from 1926 to 1931: Gifford, Horner, O'Malley, Ross, Beckwith & Potter.
Mount Horeb Public School (1941 addition), 207 Academy St Mount Horeb, WI (Law, Law & Porter),  NRHP-listed
Madison Vocational School (1949–1950 and 1964 additions) 211 N. Carroll St., Madison (Law, Law, Potter, & Nystrom), NRHP-listed
West Side School, 718 W. Phillip St. Rhinelander, WI (Law, Law and Potter),  NRHP-listed
Lake View Sanatorium, 1204 Northport Dr., Madison (Law, Law, & Potter), NRHP-listed
Tenney Building, Madison, NRHP-listed
Thorstrand, Madison, NRHP-listed (Law & Law)
Wiedenbeck-Dobelin Warehouse, Madison, NRHP-listed (Law & Law)
Wisconsin Power and Light Building, Madison
First Congregational Church, Madison
Madison General Hospital (two wings), Madison
West High School, Madison
Marquette Elementary School, Madison
Shorewood Elementary School, Madison
 Filene House, Madison <https://www.madisonpreservation.org/blog/2020/2/29/cuna-mutual-at-home-in-madison>
 Janesville Women's Club Association, Janesville, (Law, Law & Potter)
 The 1928 Tudor Revival-styled George Fifield house in the NRHP-listed Jefferson Avenue Historic District, bounded by Oakland, Garfield and Ruger Aves. and Forest Park Blvd. Janesville, WI (Law, Law and Potter). 
One or more works in  NRHP-listed  Nakoma Historic District, Roughly bounded by Odana Rd., Mantou Wy., Mowhack Dr., and Whedona Dr. Madison, WI (Law, Law, and Potter)
One or more works in  NRHP-listed West Lawn Heights Historic District, Roughly bounded by Virginia Ter., Regent St., S. Spooner Ave., and Illinois Central Railroad Madison, WI (Law, Law and Potter)

References

Architects from Wisconsin
Architecture firms based in Wisconsin